Joshua Lutz (born July 18, 1975) is an American artist working with large-format photography and with video.

Life and work
Lutz was given his first solo exhibition at Gitterman Gallery during the summer of 2004.

In 2008 Lutz's first book, Meadowlands, was published with powerHouse Books. In essayist Robert Sullivan's introduction to the book he describes the Meadowlands as “… that giant swath of swamp and space that separates New Jersey from New York City, or, put another way, from New York City and the rest of the United States of America.” The New Yorker wrote "Joshua Lutz takes the New Topographics of Adams, Shore, and Sternfeld into its current era of urban sprawl.”

In the fall of 2008 Lutz had a solo exhibition for the Meadowlands series at ClampArt Gallery in New York City.

2013 saw the release of Hesitating Beauty. A series of photographs revealing a different side of Lutz's photography, it tells the story of his mother.

Mind the Gap (2018) is "an exploration through photographs and text of how our society and the things we experience affect our mental health".

Publications
Meadowlands. powerHouse, 2008. .
Hesitating Beauty. Schilt, 2013. .
Mind the Gap. Schilt, 2018. .

References

American photographers
Living people
1975 births